Linas Garsys is an American punk rock graphic designer and co-founder of the record label, Malfunction Records.

Garsys began making artwork for local punk and hardcore bands in his teens. Over time this expanded to making work for national acts, such as AFI, American Nightmare, and Tiger Army, as well as collaborating with brands such as Urban Outfitters

In 1999, he founded Malfunction Records with Tru Pray. In 2007, the label was sold to Deathwish Inc.

List of bands for whom Garsys has designed
Garsys has worked on art and design for dozens of bands, including:

 AFI
 Allegiance
 American Nightmare
 Bridge 9 Records
  Cast Aside
 Ceremony
 Champion
 Comeback Kid
 Four Walls Falling
 Internal Affairs
 The Nerve Agents
 Ruiner 
 Striking Distance
 Tiger Army

American Nightmare / Give up The Ghost
Garsys created the angel logo for the band American Nightmare.

References

External links
Linas Garsys Website

Living people
American male artists
American contemporary artists
American graphic designers
Artists from Baltimore
Deathwish Inc.
Year of birth missing (living people)